"Rebecca Came Back from Mecca" is a popular song with words and music by the prolific songwriting team of Bert Kalmar and Harry Ruby.  The song was published in January 1921 by Waterson, Berlin & Snyder co., New York.

"Rebecca Came Back from Mecca" had considerable popularity in its day. The song falls into the category "Oriental Fox-Trot," and is about the middle east, which was still somewhat mysterious to the average American. It is sung by a Jewish/Yiddish dialect narrator (allowing such rhymes as Rebecca/Mecca/Turkish Terbecca - Tobacco) about a New York Jewish girl who has gone to the Middle East after starring in an "oriental show" and has now returned to New York with mysterious Eastern Ways.

The song reflects changing American culture and mores at the time it was written, and even contains a reference to then-popular silent film star Theda Bara:

"She's as bold as Theda Bara
Theda's bare but Becky's barer."

The song has been recorded by Burl Ives, Monroe Silver, The New Leviathan Oriental Foxtrot Orchestra, and more recently by Janet Klein And Her Parlor Boys.

Notes 

Pop standards
American songs
Songs with lyrics by Bert Kalmar
1921 songs
Songs with music by Harry Ruby